John Brian Murtaugh (May 6, 1937 – December 10, 2017) was an American politician who served in the New York State Assembly from 1981 to 1996.

He died on December 10, 2017, in Brooklyn, New York City, New York at age 80.

References

1937 births
2017 deaths
Democratic Party members of the New York State Assembly